The Solo 2625 is a series of German aircraft engines, designed and produced by Solo Vertriebs- und Entwicklungs GmbH of Fellbach for use in ultralight aircraft, self-launching sailplanes and homebuilt aircraft.

Design and development
The engine series are all twin-cylinder two-stroke, in-line,  displacement, liquid-cooled, gasoline engine designs, with poly V belt reduction drives. They employ dual electronic ignition ignitions systems and produce , depending on the model, with a compression ratio of 9.5:1.

Variants
Solo 2625 01
Model with a single diaphragm carburetor, that produces  at 5,900 rpm.
Solo 2625 02
Model with dual diaphragm carburetors, that produces  at 6,500 rpm.
Solo 2625 02i
Model with fuel injection, that produces  at 6,600 rpm.

Applications
Binder EB28
Binder EB29
Glaser-Dirks DG-500
Glaser-Dirks DG-800
HpH 304
Rolladen-Schneider LS9
Schempp-Hirth Arcus
Schempp-Hirth Quintus
Schempp-Hirth Ventus-2
Sportinė Aviacija LAK-20

Specifications (2625 02i)

See also

References

External links
 

Solo aircraft engines
Two-stroke aircraft piston engines
Liquid-cooled aircraft piston engines
2010s aircraft piston engines